Dolgoye is a rural locality (a village) in Ostrovnoye Rural Settlement of Primorsky District, Arkhangelsk Oblast, Russia. The population was 4 as of 2010.

Geography 
Dolgoye is located 32 km northwest of Arkhangelsk (the district's administrative centre) by road. Tinovatik is the nearest rural locality.

References 

Rural localities in Primorsky District, Arkhangelsk Oblast